The Aviary at the Houston Zoo is a historic work of art created by Mexican-born architect and artist Dionicio Rodriguez located at the Houston Zoo in Houston, Texas and listed on the National Register of Historic Places. The Faux Bios sculptures were built in 1926 and dubbed the "flying sculpture." Although Hurricane Carla destroyed the aviary's wire superstructure in 1961, Rodriquez's sculptures remain and are composed of a tree, a fountain, logs, ledges and rock bordering a shallow pond which are now part of the Flamingo Habitat at the zoo.

References 

National Register of Historic Places in Texas
Buildings and structures completed in 1926
Harris County, Texas